Penicillium griseofulvum is a species of the genus of Penicillium which produces patulin, penifulvin A, cyclopiazonic acid, roquefortine C, shikimic acid, griseofulvin, and 6-Methylsalicylic acid (via a polyketide synthase). Penicillium griseofulvum occurs on cereals and nuts.

Further reading

References

griseofulvum
Fungi described in 1901